The Wading River is a tributary of the Mullica River, approximately  long, in southern New Jersey in the United States. The river drains a rural forested area of the Pinelands, one of the most pristine areas along the coast of the northeastern United States.

Course
The primary source of the Wading River is its  West Branch, which rises north of Chatsworth in central Burlington County, south of Brendan T. Byrne State Forest, and flows generally south through Wharton State Forest. It joins the Oswego River near Harrisville to form the main stem of the Wading River. The lower  of the river forms a navigable estuary, an arm of the estuary of the Mullica, just west of the Garden State Parkway.

Like the Mullica, the river is noted for its extensive wetlands, including large runs of striped bass.

Tributaries
 Oswego River
 Tulpehocken Creek
 West Branch Wading River

See also
 List of rivers of New Jersey

References

External links
 Trails.com description

Rivers of Burlington County, New Jersey
Tributaries of the Mullica River
Rivers in the Pine Barrens (New Jersey)
Rivers of New Jersey